Andrew Gachkar (born November 4, 1988) is a former American football linebacker in the National Football League for the San Diego Chargers, Dallas Cowboys and Carolina Panthers. He was drafted by the San Diego Chargers in the seventh round of the 2011 NFL Draft. He played college football at the University of Missouri.

Early years
Gachkar grew up in Overland Park, Kansas and attended Blue Valley West High School. As a junior, he registered 83 tackles, 5 sacks, 2 interceptions (one returned for a touchdown) and 2 forced fumbles. 

As a senior, he was limited by a shoulder injury, but still managed to be a two-way player at running back and linebacker. He was rated the number 10 overall prospect in the state of Kansas by Super Prep.

College career
Gachkar accepted a football scholarship from the University of Missouri. As a true freshman, he appeared in 14 games, playing mainly on special teams. He made 16 defensive tackles and one forced fumble.

As a sophomore, he recovered from four surgeries in the off-season, where he had a rib removed to alleviate blood clotting issues in his right arm and upper body. He appeared in 14 games as a backup, collecting 28 tackles (one for loss).

As a junior, he started in 13 games at strongside linebacker, posting 80 tackles (second on the team), 3 sacks and 3 fumble recoveries (led the team). He was part of a defense that ranked 26th in the nation against the run (118.62-yard avg.). He had 4 tackles, one tackle, one forced fumble and 2 fumble recoveries against the University of Nebraska. He made 9 tackles against Oklahoma State University. He had 10 tackles against Kansas State University.

As a senior, he was moved to weakside linebacker to replace All-American Sean Weatherspoon. He started in 13 games, finishing with 51 tackles (led the team), 8.5 tackles for loss, one sack and 2 interceptions. He was a part of the number one scoring defense in the nation.

Professional career

San Diego Chargers
Gachkar was selected by the San Diego Chargers in the seventh round (234th overall) of the 2011 NFL Draft. On July 28, 2011, he was signed to a four-year deal with the Chargers. As a rookie, he posted 15 defensive tackles and 12 special teams tackles (second on the team).

He became a valuable special teams player, while also being a solid reserve linebacker. In 2012, he recorded 13 tackles (2 for loss), one sack and 8 special teams tackles. 

In 2013, he started 3 out of 16 games, making 33 tackles (one for loss), one forced fumble and 8 special teams tackles. He had 6 tackles and one forced fumble against the Tennessee Titans. He made 8 tackles against the Washington Redskins.

In 2014, he received more playing time due to injuries and defensive coordinator John Pagano rotations at linebacker. He appeared in 15 games with 5 starts, registering, 49 tackles (6 for loss), one sack, one pass defensed 16 special teams tackles and also scored his first NFL touchdown against the St. Louis Rams on a fumble recovery. He had 8 tackles against the Denver Broncos.

Dallas Cowboys
On March 15, 2015, he signed with the Dallas Cowboys a two-year, $5.5 million contract, reuniting with former Chargers special teams coordinator Rich Bisaccia. As a reserve linebacker, he showed the ability to play all three positions and made Jasper Brinkley expendable. He started against the New Orleans Saints and posted 6 tackles. In the eighth game of the season against the Philadelphia Eagles, he saw extended time in place of Sean Lee who was out with a concussion, while tallying 4 tackles (one for loss). He played in every game, registering 8 special teams tackles (tied for fourth on the team) and 13 defensive tackles.

In 2016, he remained a core special teams player, making 7 defensive tackles, 2 quarterback pressures and 7 special teams tackles (tied for fourth on the team). In the season finale against the Philadelphia Eagles, the Cowboys rested players for the playoffs and Gachkar saw extended playing time, posting 5 tackles (one for loss), 2 quarterback pressures and a half-sack. He wasn't re-signed after the season.

Jacksonville Jaguars
On August 13, 2017, Gachkar signed with the Jacksonville Jaguars. He was released on September 2, 2017.

Carolina Panthers
On October 17, 2017, Gachkar signed with the Carolina Panthers. He appeared in 6 games and was declared inactive in 4 contests, while making 5 special teams tackles (tied for third on the team). He wasn't re-signed after the season.

Personal life
Gachkar overcame a life-threatening ailment to even be able to play football. In 2007, after his freshman year at Missouri, he was diagnosed with Thoracic Outlet Syndrome. He had developed a blood clot because his collarbone and rib cage were too close together to allow proper blood flow through his veins. As a result, he  underwent major surgery to remove one of his ribs, and a second surgery after another clot developed. Gachkar spent more than 20 hours in surgery and nearly a month in the hospital and he lost 30 pounds. The surgeries initially put his football future in doubt, but Gachkar was diligent in his rehabilitation and he made it back for the 2008 season without missing a game.

On March 23, 2013, he married Lauren Nuckolls, a former Missouri Tiger volleyball player and his high school sweetheart.

References

External links

Missouri Tigers football bio

1988 births
Living people
American football linebackers
Carolina Panthers players
Dallas Cowboys players
Missouri Tigers football players
Sportspeople from Overland Park, Kansas
Players of American football from Kansas
San Diego Chargers players